Damisi is an album recorded by American saxophonist Harold Land in 1972 for the Mainstream label. In Swahili damisi means "cheerful".

Reception

AllMusic awarded the album 3 stars stating "The modal music, which clearly shows the influences of early fusion and funk, is interesting but very much of its period".

Track listing
All compositions by Harold Land except as indicated
 "Step Right Up to the Bottom" - 4:40
 "In the Back, in the Corner, in the Dark" - 5:48
 "Pakistan" - 7:58
 "Chocolate Mess" (Ndugu Chancler) - 7:31
 "Damisi" - 9:08
 "Dark Mood" - 8:48 Bonus track on CD reissue, taken from Choma (Burn)   
 "Up and Down" - 10:49 Bonus track on CD reissue, taken from the Mainstream LP Jazz, a sampler featuring various artists

Personnel 
Harold Land – tenor saxophone, oboe
Oscar Brashear – trumpet, flugelhorn
William Henderson – piano, electric piano
Buster Williams – bass, electric bass
Ndugu Chancler – drums

References 

1972 albums
Harold Land albums
Mainstream Records albums
Albums produced by Bob Shad